Yapıldak can refer to:

 Yapıldak, Çanakkale
 Yapıldak, İpsala